East Minster is a disused railway station serving Minster on the Isle of Sheppey. It opened in 1902 and closed in 1950.

References

External links
 East Minster station on navigable 1940 O. S. map

Disused railway stations in Kent
Former Sheppey Light Railway stations
Railway stations in Great Britain opened in 1902
Railway stations in Great Britain closed in 1950
1902 establishments in England
1950 disestablishments in England